Waddington v. Sarausad, 555 U.S. 179 (2009), was a United States Supreme Court case that involved the conviction of Cesar Sarausad for second-degree murder due to his role as driver in a shooting regarding gang activity and high school students. Sarausad sought federal habeas corpus relief, but the act of providing relief to Sarausad was called back into judicial review by the State of Washington in a certiorari petition. The Supreme Court agreed to review the case.

The Roberts Court held that Sarausad was tried with due process by the State of Washington, and that he should not have been granted habeas corpus relief. In doing so, the federal government overstepped its bounds.

References

External links
 

United States Supreme Court cases
United States Supreme Court cases of the Roberts Court
2009 in United States case law